The HTC U series is a line of upper mid-range and high-end flagship Android smartphones developed and produced by HTC. The first phones in the series, the HTC U Play and the HTC U Ultra, were announced in January 2017. The HTC U series is the successor of the HTC One series.

Phones

2017 lineup

HTC U Play 

The HTC U Play, an upper mid-range phone, was announced along with the HTC U Ultra on January 12, 2017.

 Display: 5.2" IPS S-LCD display with 1080x1920 pixel resolution
 Processor: Mediatek Helio P10
 Storage: 32 or 64 GB (expandable)
 RAM: 3 or 4 GB
 Battery: 2500 mAH

HTC U Ultra 

The HTC U Ultra, a high-end phablet, was announced on January 12, 2017, on the same day as the HTC U Play. Like the LG V10 and LG V20, the HTC U Ultra features a secondary display above the main screen.

 Display: 5.7" IPS LCD display with 1440x2560 pixel resolution (main); 2.0" IPS LCD display with 160x1040 pixel resolution (secondary)
 Processor: Qualcomm Snapdragon 821
 Storage: 64 or 128 GB (expandable)
 RAM: 4 GB
 Battery: 3000 mAH

HTC U11 

The HTC U11 flagship smartphone was announced on May 16, 2017, as the successor to HTC's 2016 flagship phone, the HTC 10. It is the world's first smartphone with pressure sensitive frame called Edge Sense where user can control various functions by squeezing the phone's sides.

 Display: 5.5" Super LCD 5 display with 1440 x 2560 pixel resolution
 Processor: Qualcomm Snapdragon 835
 Storage: 64 or 128 GB (expandable)
 RAM: 4 or 6 GB
 Battery: 3000 mAH
 Edge Sense - pressure-sensitive squeeze frame technology

HTC U11+ 
HTC announced the HTC U11+ alongside the HTC U11 Life on November 1, 2017. Unlike the HTC U11 from earlier in the year, the HTC U11+ features an upgraded 18:9 screen ratio, similar to many other 2017 flagship smartphones. According to HTC, the phone has an 82% screen-to-body ratio.

 Display: 6.0" Super LCD 6 display with 1440x2880 pixel resolution
 Processor: Qualcomm Snapdragon 835
 Storage: 64 or 128 GB (expandable)
 RAM: 4 or 6 GB
 Battery: 3930 mAH
 Edge Sense - pressure-sensitive squeeze frame technology

HTC U11 Life 
HTC announced the HTC U11 Life alongside the HTC U11+ on November 1, 2017. There are two versions of the HTC U11 Life: a version running the HTC Sense UI, which was released in the United States, and a version running Android One, which was released in other countries.

 Display: 5.2" Super LCD display with 1080x1920 pixel resolution
 Processor: Qualcomm Snapdragon 630
 Storage: 32 or 64 GB (expandable)
 RAM: 3 or 4 GB
 Battery: 2600 mAH
 Edge Sense - pressure-sensitive squeeze frame technology

2018 lineup

HTC U11 EYEs 
HTC announced the HTC U11 EYEs smartphone in January 2018.

 Display: 6.0" Super LCD3 display with 1080x2160 pixel resolution
 Processor: Qualcomm Snapdragon 652
 Storage: 64 GB (expandable)
 RAM: 4 GB
 Battery: 3930 mAH

HTC U12+ 

HTC announced the HTC U12+ flagship smartphone in May 2018. The device succeeds the 2017 HTC U11 and HTC U11+.

 Display: 6.0" Super LCD 6 display with 1440x2880 pixel resolution
 Processor: Qualcomm Snapdragon 845
 Storage: 64 or 128 GB (expandable)
 RAM: 6 GB
 Battery: 3500 mAH
 Edge Sense - pressure-sensitive squeeze frame technology

HTC U12 Life 
HTC announced the HTC U12 Life on August 30, 2018. The device succeeds the 2017 HTC U11 Life.

 Display: 6.0" display with 1080x2160 pixel resolution
 Processor: Qualcomm Snapdragon 636
 Battery: 3600 mAH

2019 lineup

HTC U19e 
HTC announced the HTC U19e Life on June 11, 2019, an upper mid-range smartphone. The device succeeds the 2018 HTC U12 Life.

 Display: 6.0" OLED display with 1080x2160 pixel resolution
 Processor: Qualcomm Snapdragon 710
 Storage: 128 GB (expandable)
 RAM: 6 GB
 Battery: 3930 mAH

2020 lineup

HTC U20 5G 
HTC announced the high-end device HTC U20 5G on June 16, 2020. The device succeeds the 2019 HTC U19e. It is the first 5G smartphone made in Taiwan.
 Display: 6.8" display with 1080x2400 pixel resolution
 Processor: Qualcomm Snapdragon 765G
 Storage: 256 GB (expandable)
 RAM: 8 GB
 Battery: 5000 mAH

See also 
 HTC One series

References 

Android (operating system) devices